Laha Mebow (born 5 December 1975) is a Taiwanese Atayal film director, screenwriter and television producer. She is notable for directing the film Hang in There, Kids! for which she won two awards at the Taipei Film Festival. She is the first female Taiwanese indigenous film director and TV producer.

Life and career
Laha Mebow was born in 1975 in Nan-ao, Taiwan. She was raised in Taichung by her father who was a police officer and her mother who was a teacher. After graduating from Shih Hsin University with a degree in film she later joined Taiwan Indigenous Television where she learned more about her heritage and indigenous culture.

In 2011, Laha Mebow made her directorial debut with Finding Sayun, a film which focuses on the stories of contemporary Atayal people in Yilan looking back to the impact on their community during the Japanese colonial period and during and after the arrival of the KMT in Taiwan. She cast the film using mainly non-professional indigenous actors and set it in her home village of Tyohemg in Yilan County. The film was released in 2011 to a mixed review by the Taipei Times but was well received by audiences. A few years later in 2016 Mebow directed her second film Hang in There, Kids!, a coming of age story about three indigenous children growing up in a remote indigenous township. The film was so well received that Taiwan's Ministry of Culture selected it as the country's entry into the Academy Award for Best Foreign Language Film. Although it failed to be nominated for the Academy Award, the film went on to win five categories at the Taipei Film Festival including Best Director and Best Narrative Feature.  She is also the director of the 2017 feature-length documentary film Ça Fait Si Longtemps, which tracks interactions of Indigenous musicians from Taiwan and Kanak and settler musicians in New Caledonia. In 2022, Laha Mebow won the Best Director award for her third feature film Gaga at the 59th Golden Horse Awards.

References

External links

 

Living people
1975 births
Taiwanese women film directors
Atayal people
People from Yilan County, Taiwan
Shih Hsin University alumni
Taiwanese screenwriters